The Doris M. Curtis Outstanding Woman in Science Award, also known as the Subaru Outstanding Woman in Science Award is a prize given annually by the Geological Society of America to "...women who have made a significant impact on the geosciences with their Ph.D. research." The award is named in memory of Doris Malkin Curtis, first female president of the GSA, and sponsored by Subaru.

Recipients of the award are listed below.

References 

American science and technology awards
Women in science and technology